Guaca may refer to:
Guaca, a character in The Emperor's New Groove
Guacá, a corregimiento in Panama
Guaca, a town in the Santander Department in northeastern Colombia